Mandalay Chanmyathazi Airport  is a domestic airport in Myanmar that served Mandalay and surrounding areas. It has largely been replaced by Mandalay International Airport. During May 1942, the airport was under control of the Imperial Japanese Army. It was attacked by Allied bombers starting in late 1942, and on March 21, 1945, the British Army 14th Army captured the city and the airport after Japanese resistance ceased.

References

External links 
 Arrivals and departures

Airports in Myanmar
Mandalay